Damien Blanch (born 24 May 1983) is a former Ireland international rugby league footballer. He last played in the Super League as a er for the Catalans Dragons, and has previously played for the Widnes Vikings, Castleford Tigers (Heritage № 843) and the Wakefield Trinity Wildcats (Heritage № 1263).

Background
Blanch was born in Sydney, New South Wales, Australia.

Career
He received an international call-up from Ireland in November 2006, and was named in the Ireland squad for the 2008 Rugby League World Cup. He finished the tournament among the top try scorers, attracting praise from many pundits for his good performances as Ireland exceeded expectations.

He was named Ireland player of the year for 2009.

Blanch joined Catalans Dragons ahead of the 2011 Super League season, and remained there for three years before departing at the end of 2013. In 2011 he was the club's top try-scorer.

He was named in the Ireland squad for the 2013 Rugby League World Cup.

He is currently playing for the Thirroul Butchers in the Illawarra Coal League.

References

External links

Wakefield Trinity Wildcats profile
Ireland profile
Castleford Tigers profile
(archived by web.archive.org) Widnes Profile
Blanch signs new Wakefield deal

1983 births
Living people
Australian people of Irish descent
Australian rugby league players
Castleford Tigers players
Catalans Dragons players
Ireland national rugby league team players
Rugby league players from Sydney
Rugby league wingers
Wakefield Trinity players
Widnes Vikings players